Pelotonia began in 2008 as a two-day bike ride in Columbus, Ohio, to raise funds for cancer research at the Ohio State University Comprehensive Cancer Center – The James.  Pelotonia, the Ride, includes a weekend of cycling, entertainment and volunteerism.  As a 501(c)(3) not for profit organization, Pelotonia raises money for cancer research at The Ohio State University Comprehensive Cancer Center - James Cancer Hospital and Solove Research Institute.

History

Pelotonia was founded in 2008 as a 501(c)(3) to create a cycling event to raise funds for cancer research.

The 2013 event drew 6,723 riders and more than 2,300 volunteers. The slightly more than $19 million raised in 2013 brought the total raised for cancer research over the first five years of the event to more than $61 million.

Since it's founding in 2008, Pelotonia  Pelotonia has raised more than $258 million.

The James
Pelotonia funds are used to recruit and retain research talent, purchase equipment, fund research for students through the Pelotonia Fellowship program, and fund two-year faculty teams for novel research ideas aimed at the prevention and/or treatment of cancer through the Pelotonia Research Award Program.

The Pelotonia Research Award Program provides grants to scientists for research on better treatments and prevention strategies. To date, 108 research teams have received Pelotonia grants.

Event format
To participate in Pelotonia, riders sign up to bike one of several possible distances, ranging from 25 to 200 miles, with ascending mandatory minimum fundraising goals.

Pelotonia typically takes place the first weekend of August every year.

See also
List of health-related charity fundraisers

References

External links 

 

2008 establishments in Ohio
Cancer fundraisers
Cancer charities in the United States
Organizations established in 2008
Recurring events established in 2009
Charities based in Ohio
Medical and health organizations based in Ohio
Sports in Columbus, Ohio
Cycling events in the United States